The Φ-lab (Phi-lab) at the European Space Agency has the mission of accelerating the future of Earth observation exploiting transformational innovation to strengthen the world leading competitiveness, by helping the earth observation researchers and entrepreneurs to adopt disruptive technologies and methods. It is currently working on artificial intelligence, quantum computing, small satellites onboard artificial intelligence, hyperspectral imaging data, and virtual reality.

The Φ-lab is also an investors in innovative space business via its InCubed co-funding programme  providing rapid funding to innovative public private partnerships to exploit new Earth Observation markets.

The Φ-lab acts as an hub between industry, academia and investors and maintain the Φ-lab community where people and talents can share ideas and needs.

The Φ-lab is a division of the ESA Earth Observation Programme that is developing future systems for earth observation. The Φ-lab brings experts from across the world to develop research on the relevance for Earth Observation of emerging technology topics including artificial intelligence, distributed ledgers and quantum computing. Representatives from industry, or academia can propose to work with Φ-lab on their own innovative case study, getting access to ESA EO huge competence, computing resources, and facilities. They usually stay with Φ-lab from few weeks, for a full immersion, up to 2 years for a more strategic partnership. 

The Φ-lab is also producing artificial intelligence software and making it available online as open source.

See also 
The Φ-lab Community
The Φ-lab on GitHub

References

European Space Agency programmes